A beach ball is an inflatable ball for beach and water games.  

Beach Ball or Beachball may refer to:

 Beach Ball, a 1965 film
 "Beachball" (song), by Nalin & Kane

See also
 Beachball plot, colloquial name for the graphical representation of moment tensor solutions of earthquakes, see Focal mechanism
 Beach Ball Classic, a basketball competition